Ben Frank (September 2, 1934 – September 11, 1990)  was a veteran character actor. His wife was producer Bobbi Frank.

Biography
Frank was born in New York on September 2, 1934. As a child from the ages of 6 to 12 he sang on stage. In later years he was a professional boxer and had only two losses from twenty bouts.

Career
His career spanned 28 years. He appeared in 20 motion movies and had 125 television roles. He also appeared in 20 stage plays, including the then renowned West Hollywood Gallery Theatre’s 1971 production  of “King of the Schnorrers” where he created the re-written role of Yankela.  His first role was in 1963, in the horror movie Terrified where he played the part of Duell. Other films included So Evil, My Sister, a 1974 film that starred Susan Strasberg. In 1975 he appeared as Hopper McGee in the movie about Murph the Surf released as Live A Little, Steal A Lot, a film that starred Robert Conrad and Don Stroud. He also appeared in Death Wish II (1982) playing the part of Lt. Mankiewicz. He appeared in the Tales from the Darkside episode "A New Lease on Life" (1986).

Frank produced and had the lead in a 1986 film  called Hollywood Zap in which he played a hustler.

He was involved in an anti smoking commercial not long before he died.

Filmography

References

External links

 BenFrank Battlestar Wiki

1934 births
1990 deaths
20th-century American male actors